The 2004 Big 12 Conference softball tournament was held at ASA Hall of Fame Stadium in Oklahoma City, OK from May 12 through May 15, 2004. Nebraska won their third conference tournament and earned the Big 12 Conference's automatic bid to the 2004 NCAA Division I softball tournament. 

Oklahoma would go on to play in the 2004 Women's College World Series.

Standings
Source:

Schedule
Source:

All-Tournament Team
Source:

References

Big 12 Conference softball tournament
Tournament
Big 12 softball tournament